Sobreda is a former civil parish in the municipality of Almada, Lisbon metropolitan area, Portugal. In 2013, the parish merged into the new parish Charneca de Caparica e Sobreda. The population in 2011 was 15,166, in an area of 6.16 km2.

References

Former parishes of Almada